Parliamentary elections were held in Hungary on 8 April 2018. The elections were the second since the adoption of a new constitution, which came into force on 1 January 2012. The result was a victory for the Fidesz–KDNP alliance, preserving its two-thirds majority, with Viktor Orbán remaining Prime Minister. Orbán and Fidesz campaigned primarily on the issues of immigration and foreign meddling, and the election was seen as a victory for right-wing populism in Europe.

Background
At the previous parliamentary election, in April 2014, the incumbent government—composed of Fidesz and its satellite ally the Christian Democratic People's Party (KDNP)—was able to achieve a two-thirds majority for the second consecutive time with 44.87 percent of the votes. According to their critics, this overwhelming proportion was only because of the new election law (mostly due to the introduction of compensation votes also for the individual winners) which was adopted by the ruling coalition in 2011. In early 2015, however, Fidesz lost its two-thirds majority following the 2014 Hungarian Internet tax protests and subsequent decrease in support for the government. The governing party suffered defeats at two parliamentary by-elections in February and April 2015, both in Veszprém County.

The left-wing electoral alliance Unity, which failed to win the 2014 national election after its five constituent parties gained a total of only 38 seats, broke up shortly thereafter. Its former member parties (MSZP, Együtt–PM and DK) participated in the May 2014 European Parliament election individually, while the MLP did not participate in the election at all. Due to this fragmentation of the left-wing opposition, the radical nationalist Jobbik became the second largest party in a nationwide election for the first time since its establishment. The PM broke off the permanent nature of its alliance with Együtt on 9 November 2014.

The Hungarian government also criticised the official European Union policy for not dissuading migrants from entering Europe. The barrier became successful, as from 17 October 2015 onward, thousands of migrants were diverted daily to Slovenia instead.

On 13 December 2015, the 26th congress of the ruling Fidesz re-elected Viktor Orbán as party leader. Orbán said in his speech that he was ready to lead the party into the forthcoming parliamentary election and to continue to serve as prime minister if Fidesz won re-election in 2018. With that statement, Orbán made clear that he did not intend to become President of Hungary in succession to János Áder during the 2017 indirect presidential election.

On 2 October 2017, the elected leader of the MSZP, László Botka, announced his withdrawal, saying that he thought some of the Hungarian opposition did not care about changing government.

Orbán and Fidesz's strength going into the election came into question when the party unexpectedly lost a mayoral by-election in Hódmezővásárhely, considered a Fidesz stronghold, on 25 February 2018, to an independent candidate supported by every opposition party. Election observers and critics of Orbán speculated whether Hungary's opposition parties could create a similar alliance on the national level, though the opposition parties had been unable to create a common strategy by late March 2018. Orbán increased his efforts as a result of this loss.

According to observers prior to the election, winning re-election was seen as more difficult for Orbán than expected.

Electoral system

The 199 members of the National Assembly were to be elected by two methods; 106 would be elected in single-member constituencies by first-past-the-post voting, with the remaining 93 elected from a single nationwide constituency mostly by proportional representation, via a partially compensatory system (a hybrid of parallel voting and the mixed single vote). The electoral threshold was set at 5%, although this was raised to 10% for coalitions of two parties and 15% for coalitions of three or more parties. Seats were to be allocated using the d'Hondt method.

Opinion polls

Candidates

Individual candidates 
The following table contains a selected list of numbers of individual candidates by county representation and party affiliation:

National lists
Under the election law, parties which ran individual candidates in at least 27 constituencies in Budapest and at least nine counties had the opportunity to set up a national list. The following table contains only the incumbent parliamentary parties' national lists (first 20 members), which were able to secure mandates:

Results

Party list results by county and in the diaspora

Reactions
Following his election defeat, Gábor Vona, chairman of Jobbik, tendered his resignation. The entire Socialist leadership also resigned.

Orbán was congratulated by German Chancellor Angela Merkel, Polish Prime Minister Mateusz Morawiecki, Czech Prime Minister Andrej Babiš, Israeli Prime Minister Benjamin Netanyahu, European Council President Donald Tusk, British foreign minister Boris Johnson and Former Canadian prime minister Stephen Harper. In addition, numerous hard-right and far-right European leaders, including Marine Le Pen, Geert Wilders, Beatrix von Storch, Vice Chancellor of Austria Heinz-Christian Strache, Matteo Salvini, Alexander Gauland, Alice Weidel, and Nigel Farage, congratulated Orbán's election victory. German Interior Minister Horst Seehofer also reacted positively at the election results. U.S. President Donald Trump congratulated Orbán's election victory in a June 2018 phone conversation.

On 14 April 2018, "tens of thousands" of Hungarians protested Orbán's election victory in Budapest. According to Bloomberg News, the protests illustrated the divide in Hungarian society that existed despite Orbán's victory. Another large protest occurred the following week.

Analysis
According to The Washington Post the election was "easily the most consequential since Hungary’s post-communist transition",and it "represented a victory for the European far right". Orbán campaigned exclusively on his opposition to immigration and foreign meddling and his victory was seen as a boost for his Eurosceptic and nationalist policies as well as for other right-wing populist governments and political parties across Europe, such as in Austria and Poland. The election results strengthened Orbán's position over Hungarian politics, giving his party the ability to change Hungary's constitution again, and they were seen as a setback to the European Union along with a string of other elections throughout Europe.

The election saw a large surge in voter turnout, one of the largest in post-communist Hungarian history, which benefited Fidesz despite pre-election expectations that it would help the opposition. Fidesz significantly outperformed its election result expectations, but was reported to have lost support among younger voters. There was also a geographical split in the results, with opposition parties winning the majority of seats in Budapest, while provincial towns and rural areas were predominantly won by the Fidesz coalition. Despite this, The Washington Post described the results as "a crushing defeat for left-leaning opposition leaders".

According to Zselyke Csaky of Foreign Policy, Orbán won partially because of a growing Hungarian economy, his centralization of power over the previous eight years, and "the brutally effective propaganda campaign he has waged against all enemies". According to Shaun Walker of The Guardian, Orbán's opposition to immigration and "a coordinated, expensive and sophisticated sting operation" by the Hungarian government on various NGOs contributed to his victory.

The election was also notable for seeing a representative of Hungary's German minority be elected for the first time since 1933.

Electoral conduct
A preliminary report on the election by the Organization for Security and Co-operation in Europe (OSCE) criticised the electoral conduct and stated that Fidesz used government resources for its election campaign. A spokesman described campaigning language as "quite hostile and xenophobic". The report criticised the atmosphere as limiting wide-ranging debate and found that public television broadcasts were biased towards the governing coalition. It also criticised the use of "information campaigns" funded out of public money, which it stated generated "a pervasive overlap between state and ruling party resources, undermining contestants' ability to compete on an equal basis".

Government formation

On 12 April 2018, cabinet member Antal Rogán announced TV2 that "there will be a new government formed, mostly with new members and a new structure", in line with the government's new priorities, including demography and family policy and migrant issue. On 20 April, Orbán said "I would say that people not voted for the continuation of the work of the present government, but they want no change in the service of the goals". There he announced the replacement of János Lázár as Minister of the Prime Minister's Office, one of the most influential members of his former cabinets, and confirmed Mihály Varga will remain minister responsible for economy. He called solving demographic problems as the government's most important task. On 23 April, Zoltán Balog announced, he will step down as Minister of Human Resources, disagreeing with the prime minister over structural considerations, who intended to keep the type of superministry system. Balog will lead the Fidesz's Foundation for Civic Hungary. Next day, Sándor Fazekas also said that he will not continue his work as Minister of Agriculture after eight years. On 25 April, minister without portfolio Lajos Kósa announced he will leave the government, as Orbán entrusted him to lead the Fidesz campaign for the upcoming local elections in 2019. On the same day, the online version of ATV reported that Minister of Defence István Simicskó also left the government, and will be replaced by "a general".

Senior press officer Bertalan Havasi announced the compilation of the government on 27 April, which largely confirmed previous unofficial information. Accordingly, the name of the Ministry of National Economy was restored to Ministry of Finance, which existed before 2010. The Ministry of National Development abolished and its duties were distributed: Andrea Bártfai-Mager was appointed minister without portfolio for managing national wealth and László Palkovics became head of the newly formed Ministry of National Innovation and Technology, while energy issues were assigned to the Prime Minister's Office. The Ministry of Agriculture was renamed from "Földművelésügyi Minisztérium" to "Agrárminisztérium" with no change in the scope of operations. Seven members of Orbán's third cabinet – Zsolt Semjén, Antal Rogán, Péter Szijjártó, Sándor Pintér, László Trócsányi, Mihály Varga and János Süli – retained their positions. Miklós Kásler, the Director of the National Institute of Oncology was appointed Minister of Human Resources, while incumbent Secretary of State for Agriculture István Nagy replaced his superior Sándor Fazekas. Fidesz caucus leader Gergely Gulyás became the new Minister of the Prime Minister's Office, but the evolving Prime Minister's Government Office under the direct management of Viktor Orbán has reduced his powers. Col. Gen. Tibor Benkő, who has served as Chief of the General Staff since 2010 was nominated to the position of Minister of Defence, becoming the first active military officer since the end of communism, who held the ministry.

On 10 May, the new Hungarian Parliament elected Orbán to a fourth term. Orbán's new cabinet was then sworn in on 18 May.

See also
 List of members of the National Assembly of Hungary (2018–22)

Notes

References

External links

 Valasztas

Hungary
Palriamentary
Hungary
Elections in Hungary